Élan is a former commune in the Ardennes department in the Grand Est region in northern France. On 1 January 2019, it was merged into the commune Flize.

Population

Sights
Arboretum d'Élan

See also
Communes of the Ardennes department

References

Former communes of Ardennes (department)
Ardennes communes articles needing translation from French Wikipedia
Populated places disestablished in 2019